Sedentary lifestyle is a lifestyle type, in which one is physically inactive and does little or no physical movement and or exercise. A person living a sedentary lifestyle is often sitting or lying down while engaged in an activity like socializing, watching TV, playing video games, reading or using a mobile phone or computer for much of the day. A sedentary lifestyle contributes to poor health quality, diseases as well as many preventable causes of death.

Sitting time is a common measure of a sedentary lifestyle. A global review representing 47% of the global adult population found that the average person sits down for 4.7 to 6.5 hours a day with the average going up every year. The CDC found that 25.3% of all American adults are physically inactive.

Screen time is a term for the amount of time a person spends looking at a screen such as a television, computer monitor, or mobile device. Excessive screen time is linked to negative health consequences.

Definition

Sedentary behavior is not the same as physical inactivity: sedentary behavior is defined as "any waking behavior characterized by an energy expenditure less than or equal to 1.5 metabolic equivalents (METs), while in a sitting, reclining or lying posture". Spending most waking hours sitting does not necessarily mean that an individual is sedentary, though sitting and lying down most frequently are sedentary behaviors. Esmonde-White defines a sedentary lifestyle as a lifestyle that involves "longer than six hours a day" of sedentary behavior.

Health effects
Effects of a sedentary work life or lifestyle can be either direct or indirect. One of the most prominent direct effect of a sedentary lifestyle is an increased BMI leading to obesity. A lack of physical activity is one of the leading causes of preventable death worldwide.

At least 300,000 premature deaths, and $90 billion in direct healthcare costs are caused by obesity and sedentary lifestyle per year in the US alone. It is shown to be a risk factor on its own independent of hard exercise and BMI.

Indirectly, an increased BMI due to a sedentary lifestyle can lead to decreased productivity and increased absenteeism from necessary activities like work.

A sedentary lifestyle contributes to or can be a risk factor for:
 Anxiety
 Cardiovascular disease
 Migraines
 Breast cancer
 Colon cancer
 Computer vision syndrome (only from excessive electronic use)
 Depression
 Diabetes
 Gout
 High blood pressure
 Lipid disorders
 Skin problems such as hair loss
 Mortality in adults
 Obesity
 Osteoporosis
 Scoliosis
 Spinal disc herniation (low back pain)
 Weight gain

Prevention

Adults and children spend long amounts of time sitting in a workplace or at a school, which is why interventions have been focused in these two areas. Mass media campaigns might also be able to reduce the amount of time spent sitting or lying down and positively affect the intention to be active physically.

In urban spaces
Some evidence has been found of a negative association between exposure to an existing urban motorway and moderate to vigorous physical activity. The proportion of physically active individuals was higher in high- versus low-walkability neighborhoods. Rising rates of overweight, obesity, and physical inactivity in China's rapidly growing cities and urban populations have been due to urban development practices and policies.

In a work environment
Occupational sedentary behaviour accounts for a significant proportion of sitting time for many adults. Some workplaces have implemented exercise classes at lunch, walking challenges among coworkers, or allowing employees to stand rather than sit at their desks during work. Workplace interventions such as alternative activity workstations, sit-stand desks, and promotion of stair use are among measures implemented to counter the harms of a sedentary workplace. A 2018 Cochrane review concluded that "At present there is low‐quality evidence that sit‐stand desks may reduce sitting at work in the first year of their use. However, the effects are likely to reduce with time. There is generally insufficient evidence to draw conclusions about such effects for other types of interventions and for the effectiveness of reducing workplace sitting over periods longer than one year."

In education
The majority of time children are in a classroom, they are seated (60% of the time). Children who regularly engage in physical activity are more likely to become healthy adults; children benefit both physically and mentally when they replace sedentary behavior with active behavior. Despite this knowledge and due in part to an increase in sedentary behaviors, children have 8 fewer hours of free play each week than they did 20 years ago.

Several studies have examined the effects of adding height-adjustable standing desks to classrooms, which have reduced the time spent sitting. However, associating the reduction in sitting with health effects is challenging. In one study conducted on Australian school children, known as the Transform-Us! study, interventions reduced the amount of time children spent sitting in the classroom, which was associated with lower body mass index and waist circumference. The interventions used in the study included stand-up desks and easels, the use of timers, and sport and circus equipment in the classroom. Teachers also made lessons more active, and added breaks to lessons to promote active time. In the US, another intervention for children is promoting the use of active transportation to and from school, such as through the Safe Routes to School program.

History

Over the last hundred years, there has been a large shift from manual labor jobs (e.g. farming, manufacturing, building) to office jobs which is due to many contributing factors including globalization, outsourcing of jobs and technological advances (specifically internet and computers). In 1960, there was a decline of jobs requiring moderate physical activity from 50% to 20%, and one in two Americans had a physically demanding job, while in 2011 this ratio was one in five. From 1990 to 2016, there was a decrease of about one third in manual labor jobs/employment. In 2008, the United States American National Health Interview Survey found that 36% of adults were inactive, and 59% of adult respondents never participated in vigorous physical activity lasting more than 10 minutes per week.  According to a 2018 study, office based workers typically spend 70-85% sitting. In the US population, prevalence of sitting watching television or videos at least 2 h/d was high in 2015-2016 (ranging from 59% to 65%); the estimated prevalence of computer use outside school or work for at least 1 h/d increased from 2001 to 2016 (from 43% to 56% for children, from 53% to 57% among adolescents, and from 29% to 50% for adults); and estimated total sitting time increased from 2007 to 2016 (from 7.0 to 8.2 h/d among adolescents and from 5.5 to 6.4 h/d among adults).

See also 
 9 to 5
 Preventable causes of death
 Automobile dependency
 Childhood obesity
 Effects of the car on societies
 Exercise trends
 Laziness
 Neurobiological effects of physical exercise
 Obesity and walking
 Simple living
 Physical activity
 Exercise
 Sloth (deadly sin)
 Workaholic
 Lack of physical education

References

Further reading

External links 

Lifestyles
Obesity
Medical terminology

fr:Mode de vie sédentaire